List of hospitals in Nevada (U.S. state), grouped by city and sorted by hospital name.

Battle Mountain
Battle Mountain General Hospital

Boulder City
Boulder City Hospital

Caliente
Grover C. Dils Medical Center

Carson City
Carson Tahoe Health – Carson Tahoe Regional Medical Center
Carson Tahoe Cancer Center
Carson Tahoe Specialty Medical Center
Sierra Surgery Hospital
Carson Tahoe Urgent Care
Carson Tahoe Continuing Care Hospital
Carson Rehabilitation Center
Reno Orthopaedic Clinic (ROC) Express (orthopaedic urgent care)
Renown Urgent Care

Elko
Northeastern Nevada Regional Hospital

Ely
William Bee Ririe Hospital

Fallon
Banner Churchill Community Hospital

Gardnerville
Carson Valley Medical Center
Tahoe Fracture Quick Care (orthopaedic urgent care)

Hawthorne
Mount Grant General Hospital

Henderson
Healthsouth Rehabilitation Hospital – Henderson
Henderson Hospital – part of the Valley Health System (Opened October 31, 2016)
St. Rose Dominican Hospital – Rose de Lima Campus
St. Rose Dominican Hospital – Siena Campus

Incline Village
Incline Village Community Hospital

Las Vegas
AMG Specialty Hospital
Centennial Hills Hospital
Desert Springs Hospital
Desert Willow Treatment Center
Elite Medical Center, An Acute Care Hospital
Harmon Medical and Rehabilitation Hospital
Healthsouth Rehabilitation Hospital – Las Vegas
Horizon Specialty Hospital
Kindred Hospital Las Vegas, Desert Springs Campus
Kindred Hospital Las Vegas – Sahara
Lifecare Complex Care Hospital at Tenaya
Mountain View Hospital
Nevada Cancer Institute
Prime Healthcare Services – North Vista Hospital

Rawson-Neal Hospital
Southern Hills Hospital & Medical Center
Southern Nevada Adult Mental Health Services
Spring Mountain Treatment Center
Spring Valley Hospital
St. Rose Dominican Hospital – San Martín Campus
Summerlin Hospital
Sunrise Hospital & Medical Center
University Medical Center of Southern Nevada
Valley Hospital Medical Center
Vegas Valley Rehabilitation Hospital

Lovelock
Pershing General Hospital

Mesquite
Mesa View Regional Hospital

Minden
Carson Tahoe Health Minden Medical Center
Carson Valley Medical Center Urgent Care

Nellis AFB
Mike O'Callaghan Military Medical Center

North Las Vegas
North Vista Hospital
VA Southern Nevada Healthcare System

Owyhee
Owyhee Community Health Facility

Pahrump
Desert View Regional Medical Center

Reno
Reno Orthopaedic Clinic (ROC) Express (orthopaedic urgent care)
Renown Health – Renown Regional Medical Center
Renown Health – Renown South Meadows Medical Center
Prime Healthcare Services – Saint Mary's Regional Medical Center
Tahoe Pacific Hospitals
Veterans Affairs Sierra Nevada Health Care System
West Hills Hospital
Willow Springs Center

Sparks
Northern Nevada Adult Mental Health Services
Northern Nevada Medical Center
Reno Orthopaedic Clinic (ROC) Express (orthopaedic urgent care)

Tonopah
Nye Regional Medical Center – Closed August 21, 2015

Winnemucca
Golden Valley Medical Center
Humboldt General Hospital

Yerington
South Lyon Medical Center

References

Nevada
 
Hospitals